Zamdela Stadium is a multi-use stadium in Sasolburg, Free State, South Africa.  It is currently used mostly for football matches and is the home ground of Free State Champs.

Sports venues in the Free State (province)
Soccer venues in South Africa
Sasolburg